The Trinidad and Tobago Regiment is the main ground force element of the Trinidad and Tobago Defence Force. It has approximately 10,000 men and women organized into a Regiment Headquarters (located in Port of Spain) and four battalions. There is also a Volunteer Defence Force that has been renamed the Defence Force Reserves. The regiment has two primary roles: maintaining the internal security of Trinidad and Tobago, and the assistance of local law enforcement.

As one of the largest military forces in the region, the Trinidad and Tobago Regiment is also one of the main units used in peacekeeping and humanitarian situations from the Caribbean region, most recently in Grenada after Hurricane Ivan.

The Trinidad and Tobago Regiment also provides the bulk of the musicians assigned to the Trinidad and Tobago Defence Force Steel Orchestra, the world's only military steel band.

History
The Trinidad and Tobago Regiment has its origins the late 19th century, though it was directly spawned from the break-up of the Federation of the West Indies in 1962. At that time, the two battalions of the West India Regiment were split and came under the control of the main nations formed by the split. The 1st Battalion became the 1st Battalion, Jamaica Regiment, while the 2nd Battalion was transferred to Trinidad and Tobago to become the 1st Battalion, Trinidad and Tobago Regiment. A second battalion was raised in 1965, but was disbanded in 1972.

Major conflicts

The Trinidad and Tobago Regiment has been involved in two major conflicts.
On April 21, 1970, 750 members of the regiment mutinied, under the leadership of Raffique Shah and Rex Lassalle. After a five-day stand-off, the mutineers surrendered. The leadership was court-martialed and Shah, Lasalle and others were jailed (see Black Power Revolution).
On July 27, 1990, the Jamaat al Muslimeen, an islamist group with ties to Libya, attempted a coup d'état. They seized control of the Red House (the seat of the Parliament of Trinidad and Tobago) and held the Prime Minister and much of his Cabinet hostage. The Regiment surrounded the insurgents and were able to force them to surrender on August 1.
See: Jamaat al Muslimeen coup attempt

International missions
1983 to 1984 - Trinidad and Tobago contributed troops to the peacekeeping mission after the United States' invasion of Grenada (Operation Urgent Fury). The Trinidad and Tobago Government opposed the military intervention by the United States and did not participate in the invasion. However T&T deployed troops to assist in peacekeeping after the combat mission was completed.
1993 to 1996 - The Trinidad and Tobago Regiment contributed troops to the United Nations Peacekeeping Mission in Haiti (UNMIH) as part of a CARICOM contingent.
2004 to 2005 - After the mass destruction dealt to Grenada by Hurricane Ivan, the Regiment was sent immediately after to help assist the Grenadian government in security, aid distribution and rebuilding of the country.

Other incidents
On 26 April 1988 - A bush fire near Camp Omega, a military compound in Chaguaramas which was used for ammunition storage and infantry training, killed two soldiers and four firefighters when the fire spread to one of the buildings housing the ammunition.

Organisation

Although it is called the Trinidad & Tobago Regiment, the unit is in fact structured more like a light infantry brigade, with a pair of infantry battalions, plus engineering and logistic support units:
1st Battalion: This is a regular infantry battalion. It is located at Camp Ogden, Long Circular Road, St James.
2nd Battalion: This a regular infantry battalion. Formerly located at Camp Mausica, since then it has been relocated to the Chaguaramas Heliport and is due to be relocated to a new camp in La Romaine, Trinidad and Tobago.
3rd Battalion: This provides engineering support. It is located at Cumuto Barracks, Wallerfield.
Support and Services Battalion: This provides logistic and administrative support to the Regiment. It is located at Teteron Barracks, Teteron Bay, Chaguaramas.

The Regiment maintains a base at Camp Omega, also at Chaguaramas, used primarily for specialised training.

Equipment

Infantry weapons
 Browning Hi-Power 
 Heckler and Koch USP 9mm handgun (75x)
 Heckler & Koch HK417
 Heckler & Koch HK416
 Heckler & Koch G36
 Heckler & Koch UMP
 Smith & Wesson M&P (1,500x)
 Smith & Wesson Model 36
 IMI Uzi
 FN P90
 H&K MP5
 Sterling L2A3 (178x)
 M16 (100x)
 IMI Galil AR (1500x)
 IWI  Galil ACE
 FN FAL 50.00
 L1A1 SLR
 IMI Negev
 IMI Tavor TAR-21
/ FN MAG 60.20/L7A1
 Bren
 Saco M60 machine gun
 Browning M2HB
 IMI B-300 82mm anti-tank rocket launchers (13x)
 Carl Gustav M2 84mm recoilless rifles (24x)
 L16A1 81mm medium mortar (6x)
 Brandt 60 mm LR Gun-mortar
 Land Rover Defender
 Land Rover Defender with Armoured-Kit
 M35A1 trucks

Navy

Patrol craft (6x)
Fast Patrol boats (3x)
Interceptor boats (6x)

Aircraft

Fixed wing aircraft
 Fairchild C-26 Metroliner (2x)

Helicopters
 AgustaWestland AW139 (4x)
 Sikorsky S-76A Spirit (4x)
 MBB Bo 105CBS (4x)
 Eurocopter AS355 (1x)

Ranks
The ranks employed by the Trinidad and Tobago Regiment:
Officers

Enlisted

References

Bibliography
'We have always had an army'
Soldiers sent packing from their base

Notes

External links
Trinidad and Tobago Regiment - Official Website

Military of Trinidad and Tobago
Regiments of Caribbean nations